Château de Beauséjour is a château in Tocane-Saint-Apre, Dordogne, Nouvelle-Aquitaine, France.

Châteaux in Dordogne